Wendens Ambo is a village in the Uttlesford district of Essex, England. The population at the 2011 census was measured at 473. Its name originates from the merging of two originally separate villages called Wenden Magna (or Great Wenden) and Wenden Parva (or Little Wenden), ambo being the Latin for "both".

Situation 
Wendens Ambo is approximately two miles south-west of the market town of Saffron Walden, fifteen miles south of Cambridge and forty miles north of London. Within the village is Audley End railway station which is the main station for Audley End House and Saffron Walden.

History 
The earliest signs of settlement are from the Roman period. Remains of a villa were found during an excavation in 1853, and finds of flint tools from 300–200 BC suggest an even earlier settlement.

It is likely that the farming community of Wenden started around the 6th and 7th centuries, taking its name from the valley in which it lies: Wendene. The Domesday Book contains the first written account of Wenden Magna and Wenden Parva. Wenden Magna was owned by Robert Gernon, a Frenchman who also had land in Stansted and Takeley. Wenden Parva was also owned by a Frenchman, William de Warenne. A third Wenden, higher up the valley to the west is Wenden Lofts (probably the "Loutes Wenden" mentioned in a legal record of 1470, where the nearby villages of "Arkysden" and "Elmedon" are also mentioned.)

During the 17th century work began to rebuild the village dwellings, some of which are still occupied today. Also at this time, on 23 March 1662, Wenden Magna and Wenden Parva were joined to create Wendens Ambo.

The 18th and 19th centuries brought the Industrial Revolution and also the railway, providing opportunities for work elsewhere, leading to Wenden eventually becoming a commuter village.

See also
The Hundred Parishes
Waldstock Festival UK

References

External links

 Wendens Ambo Parish Council's Website
Wendens Ambo Church and Village

Villages in Essex
Uttlesford